The Newberry Historic District is a U.S. historic district (designated as such on December 24, 1987) located in Newberry, Florida. It contains 48 historic buildings.

References

External links
 Florida's Office of Cultural and Historical Programs - Alachua County
 Historic Markers in Alachua County
 National Register of Historic Places

National Register of Historic Places in Alachua County, Florida
Historic districts on the National Register of Historic Places in Florida